The 2009 Glasgow North East by-election was a by-election for the Parliament of the United Kingdom's House of Commons constituency of Glasgow North East. The by-election was held on 12 November 2009 following the resignation of Michael Martin as an MP and as Speaker of the House of Commons following the MPs' expenses scandal. Martin was the first Speaker since Sir John Trevor in 1695 to be forced from office. Willie Bain, the Scottish Labour Party candidate, won with 59% of the vote. Just 33% of the electorate voted, which is the lowest ever percentage turnout in a Scottish by-election to the House of Commons.

There was a longer than normal gap between a seat falling vacant and the by-election. On 22 July, during a brief debate in the House of Commons, the UK Government refused to move the writ before the summer recess.

It is a convention (not always observed in practice) that mainstream political parties do not contest elections against sitting Speakers of the House of Commons. As such, Michael Martin won Glasgow North East without his former Labour Party label, and neither the Conservative nor Liberal Democrat parties had fought the constituency (or its predecessor, Glasgow Springburn) in either 2001 or 2005.

This was the last by-election of the 2005–2010 parliament.

Candidates
Labour selected Willie Bain, a law lecturer and Constituency Labour Party secretary, as their candidate. Michael Martin's son Paul Martin, the MSP for the roughly equivalent Glasgow Springburn Scottish Parliament constituency, had ruled himself out.

The Scottish National Party (SNP) selected David Kerr. They had previously selected James Dornan, their leader on Glasgow City Council, but on 12 July he announced that he was withdrawing as a candidate following allegations in the Sunday Herald over past financial difficulties.

The Conservative Party selected Ruth Davidson, a journalist and broadcaster, as well as a Territorial Army volunteer and Sunday school teacher.

The Scottish Liberal Democrats selected the South Lanarkshire councillor Eileen Baxendale as their candidate.

The Scottish Socialist Party decided to stand Kevin McVey, a party organiser from Cumbernauld who promised to reject the £64,000 MP's salary and "live instead on the average skilled worker's wage - not a penny more". On the ballot paper the party opted to use the description "Scottish Socialist Party – Make Greed History"

Solidarity initially called on the SSP, the Socialist Labour Party and themselves to adopt a "left unity" candidate. However, they later announced that they had selected Tommy Sheridan to fight the by-election, claiming he might have stood down in favour of a left unity candidate. On the ballot paper the party used the full description "Solidarity – Scotland’s Socialist Movement"

Former Big Brother housemate Mikey Hughes stood as an independent candidate.

The British National Party (BNP) selected Charlie Baillie as their candidate who stood as second candidate on the list for Scotland in the 2009 European Election.

The Jury Team, an umbrella organisation aiming to support Independent candidates in UK elections, selected John Smeaton, the former Glasgow Airport baggage handler who became known for his intervention during the 2007 Glasgow International Airport attack as its first candidate for a Westminster election. On declaration of his candidacy in September, he was given the third shortest odds to win the seat.

David Doherty, an environmental protection graduate of the University of Strathclyde, was the Scottish Green Party candidate.

The Socialist Labour Party stood Louise McDaid, who topped their party list for Scotland in the 2009 European Election.

Mev Brown stood as an independent candidate. Colin Campbell stood for The Individuals Labour and Tory (TILT).

Official candidate names and ballot paper descriptions were confirmed by Glasgow City Council on 28 October 2009.

Result

2005 election result

See also
2009 Speaker of the British House of Commons election

References

Glasgow North East by-election
Glasgow North East by-election
2000s elections in Scotland
Glasgow North East by-election
By-elections to the Parliament of the United Kingdom in Glasgow constituencies
2000s in Glasgow
Springburn